Jovinow (also Romanized as Jovīnow) is a village in Dasht-e Laleh Rural District, Asir District, Mohr County, Fars Province, Iran. At the 2006 census, its population was 105, in 22 families.

References 

Populated places in Mohr County